Hâlit Ziyâ Konuralp (1904-2005) was a Turkish plastic surgeon and professor. He was one of the founders of the Turkish Society of Plastic Surgeons.

References

1904 births
2005 deaths